The 2020–21 Russian Cup was the 29th season of the Russian football knockout tournament since the dissolution of the Soviet Union.
The competition started on 5 August 2020 and concluded on 12 May 2021.

Representation of clubs by league
 Russian Premier League: 16 clubs
 National Football League: 20 clubs
 Russian Professional Football League 54 clubs
 Due to the difficult epidemiological situation caused by the COVID-19 pandemic, amateur clubs do not participate in the cup.
 Total - 90 clubs.

Qualifying round

1/256 Round
At this stage, the PFL teams enter the tournament, which are distributed along the cup grid.
The draw for the qualifying round (1/256 and 1/128 finals) was held at the House of Football on July 29, it determined the home team in the previously drawn tournament grid.
West-Center

Ural-Povolzhye

South

1/128 Round
West-Center

East

Ural-Povolzhye

South

1/64
At this stage, the FNL teams enter the tournament, they determine 10 winners among themselves. The PFL teams also determine 10 winners among themselves.

FNL teams
The draw for the 1/64 finals of the Russian Cup for FNL clubs took place on 5 August. Based on its results, pairs were formed and the hosts of the matches were determined.

PFL Teams
East

West-Center

South

Ural-Povolzhye

Elite group round (1/32 and 1/16 finals) 
At this stage, 10 RPL teams enter the tournament, not playing in European competition. They are joined by 10 FNL teams and 10 PFL teams, winners of the last stage of the cup. The selection takes place in 10 groups. Each group contains one team from RPL, FNL and PFL.

The draw for the participants in the elite group round took place on 4 September.

The group stage will be held in 3 rounds. At the same time, teams from the lower leagues will play matches at home:
 1st round. September 15-17 and 23. PFL teams - RPL teams.
 2nd round. September 30 - October 1. PFL teams - FNL teams.
 3rd round. October 21-22. FNL teams - RPL teams.

The system of scoring and determining the winners in the group round based on the results of each match:
 for winning in regulation time - 3 points.
 for a draw in regulation time and a victory on penalties - 2 points.
 for a draw in regulation time and defeat on penalties - 1 point.
 points are not awarded for a defeat in regular time.

Group 1

Group 2

Group 3

Group 4

Group 5

Group 6

Group 7

Group 8

Group 9

Group 10

Round of 16

Quarter-finals

Semi-finals

Final

References

External links
 Official page

Russian Cup seasons
Cup
Russian Cup
Russian